Southern hip hop, also known as Southern rap, South Coast hip hop, or dirty south, is a blanket term for a regional genre of American hip hop music that emerged in the Southern United States, especially in Atlanta, New Orleans, Houston, Memphis, and Miami—five cities which constitute the "Southern Network" in rap music.

The music was a reaction to the 1980s flow of hip hop culture from New York City and the Los Angeles area and can be considered the third major American hip hop scene, alongside East Coast hip hop and West Coast hip hop. Many early Southern rap artists released their music independently or on mixtapes after encountering difficulty securing record-label contracts in the 1990s. By the early 2000s, many Southern artists had attained success, and as the decade went on, both mainstream and underground varieties of Southern hip hop became among the most popular and influential of the entire genre.

History

Throughout the 1980s and 1990s, the American hip hop music market was primarily dominated by artists from the East Coast and West Coast. Los Angeles and New York City were the two main cities where hip hop was receiving widespread attention. The West Coast was mainly represented by groups like N.W.A., Death Row Records, and the East Coast had people like The Notorious B.I.G. and groups like the Wu-Tang Clan, Mobb Deep and Bad Boy Records. In the late 1980s, cities throughout the Southern United States began to catch on to the hip hop music movement. The Geto Boys, a hip hop group from Houston, were among the first hip hop artists from the Southern United States to gain widespread popularity. Southern hip hop's roots can be traced to the success of the group's Grip It! On That Other Level in 1989, the Rick Rubin-produced The Geto Boys in 1990, and We Can't Be Stopped in 1991.

By the mid-1990s, Atlanta had become a center in Southern hip hop music. Local production crews such as Organized Noize that represented hip hop groups such as OutKast and Goodie Mob played a huge part in helping the South become a center for hip hop music.

A defining moment for Southern rap was at the 1995 Source Awards. The duo Outkast had just been awarded Best New Artist, and within the tension that was the East Coast–West Coast feud, member André 3000 came up on stage followed by boos and said, "But it's like this though, I'm tired of them closed minded folks, it's like we gotta demo tape but don't nobody want to hear it. But it's like this: the South got something to say, that's all I got to say." As stated by rapper T.I., "Outkast, period. Outkast. That's when it changed. That was the first time when people began to take Southern rap seriously."

The most successful Southern independent labels during the mid-to-late 90s came out of the cities of Memphis and New Orleans. Both scenes borrowed heavily from a production style first introduced by way of the obscure late-1980s New York rap group The Showboys, heavily sampling the beats from their song "Drag Rap (Trigger Man)". By the early 2000s, these scenes found mainstream success through Cash Money Records and No Limit Records out of New Orleans, and Hypnotize Minds out of Memphis, revolutionizing financial structures and strategies for independent Southern rap labels. According to HipHopDX, "Not only is the South on the radar, but now the region that was an underdog is the barometer for rap music and hip-hop culture." 
By the early to mid-2000s, artists from all over the South had begun to develop mainstream popularity with artists like Slim Thug, Paul Wall, Mike Jones, and Lil Keke from Houston; T.I., Ludacris, Bubba Sparxxx, Lil Jon, Gucci Mane and Young Jeezy from Atlanta; Trick Daddy and Rick Ross from Miami; Master P B.G., Lil Wayne and Juvenile from New Orleans, and Three 6 Mafia from Memphis all becoming major label stars during this time.

Southern hip hop peaked in popularity from 2002 through 2004. In 2002, Southern hip hop artists accounted for 50 to 60 percent of the singles on hip hop music charts. On the week of December 13, 2003, Southern urban artists, labels and producers accounted for six of the top 10 slots on the Billboard Hot 100: OutKast (with two singles), Ludacris, Kelis (produced by The Neptunes), Beyoncé and Chingy (on Ludacris' Disturbing Tha Peace label). Additionally, from October 2003 through December 2004, the number one position on the Billboard Hot 100 pop chart was held by a Southern urban artist for 58 out of 62 weeks. This was capped by the week of December 11, 2004 when seven out of the top ten songs on the chart were held by or featured Southern urban artists. In 2004, Vibe magazine reported that Southern artists accounted for 43.6% of the airplay on urban radio stations (compared to 29.7% for the Midwest, 24.1% for the East Coast and 2.5% for the West coast).

Louisiana

In the late 1990s "bounce" music was born in New Orleans. Master P established No Limit Records. In 1992, Cash Money Records was founded, releasing bounce and gangsta rap music.

Florida

The single "Throw The D" by the group 2 Live Crew in January 1986 was the first Miami bass song. Fresh Kid Ice (Christopher Wong Won) said that the song came about when he noticed a new popular dance in Miami, when Herman Kelly and Life's song "Dance to the drummer's beat" played. 2 Live Crew released their album As Nasty As They Wanna Be in 1989.

Tennessee

Three 6 Mafia, Project Pat, Eightball and MJG, Yo Gotti, Moneybagg Yo, Pooh Shiesty, and Young Dolph all came from Memphis, Tennessee.

Alabama
The gangsta rap group Dirty is from Montgomery, Alabama.

Georgia

In 2009, the New York Times called Atlanta "hip-hop's center of gravity", and the city is home to many famous hip-hop, R&B and neo soul musicians.

In the 1980s and early 1990s, Atlanta's hip hop scene was characterized by a local variant of Miami bass, with stars like Kilo Ali and DJ Smurf (later Mr. Collipark).

By the mid-1990s, the rise of OutKast, Goodie Mob and the production collective Organized Noize, let to the development of the Dirty South style of hip-hop and of Atlanta gaining a reputation for "soul-minded hip-hop eccentrics", contrasting with other regional styles. On August 3, 1995, Outkast received the award for Best New Artist in New York City at the Source Awards. At the time, the primary hip hop heard nationally was from artists on the East and West Coasts, due at least partly to high- profile disputes between rappers from each coast. It was groups such as Outkast who were determined to let the world know that the South had something to say.

In 2009, it was noted that after 2000/2001, Atlanta moved "from the margins to becoming hip-hop's center of gravity, part of a larger shift in hip-hop innovation to the South", primarily due to the massive popularity of Waka Flocka Flame's 2009 debut mixtape. Producer Drumma Boy called Atlanta "the melting pot of the South". Producer Fatboi called the Roland TR-808 ("808") synthesizer "central" to Atlanta music's versatility, used for snap, crunk, trap, and pop rap styles. The same article named Drumma Boy, Fatboi, Shawty Redd, Lex Luger and Zaytoven the five "hottest producers driving the city".

Texas

In the late 1980s, the Geto Boys were Houston's first hip hop group to gain mainstream popularity. In the early 1990s, Texas groups such as Nemesis, PKO, and UGK (from Dallas, San Antonio, and Port Arthur respectively) also gained popularity. Before the early 1990s, most Southern hip hop was upbeat and fast, like Miami bass and crunk. In Texas, however, the music started to become slower. In the early 1990s, DJ Screw created "chopped and screwed" music. Although people associated with Screw have indicated any time between 1987 and 1991, Screw said he started slowing music down in 1990. In Tulsa, Oklahoma, DJ Dinero and DJ Z-Nasty helped popularize chopped and screwed music in the Mid South.

Between 1991 and 1992, there was increased abuse of purple drank in East Texas. Purple drank was a major influence in chopped and screwed music due to its effect of slowing down perception. DJ Screw, a known user of purple drank, said that it is not required to enjoy chopped and screwed music and that he came up with the style when high on marijuana.

As the spread of Southern hip hop continued, its mainstream breakthrough occurred in 2000. Duo UGK made a high-profile guest appearance on Jay-Z's hit "Big Pimpin'" and also appeared on Three 6 Mafia's hit "Sippin' on Some Syrup". Both of these collaborations greatly increased their reputation and helped fuel anticipation for their next project. UGK's Pimp C died from a sudden heart attack after overdosing on purple drank on December 4, 2007 at the age of 33. A song that originally appeared on the compilation album The Day Hell Broke Loose 2, Mike Jones' "Still Tippin'", achieved mainstream success in 2004 leading to local Houston rap label Swishahouse signing a national distribution deal with Asylum Records. Jones released his major label debut, Who Is Mike Jones?, on Swishahouse/Warner Bros. in April 2005 and was certified platinum that June. Paul Wall's major label debut, The Peoples Champ, on Swishahouse/Atlantic, was released in September 2005, eventually topping the Billboard 200.

North Carolina 

Around the same time, Ski Beatz (of Greensboro) produced "Dead Presidents" on Jay-Z's album "Reasonable Doubt", which was released in 1996. Also, 9th Wonder (of Winston-Salem) joined a group named Little Brother with fellow members Big Pooh and Phonte (of Durham).(9th Wonder left Little Brother in 2007 to solo produce, becoming one of the top 10 most successful hip hop producers of all time).

North Carolina did not hit the mainstream hip hop map until 2001 with Petey Pablo's "Raise Up". This song was wildly successful and helped shine a much-needed national spotlight on North Carolina's burgeoning rap industry, along with some of its biggest names and some longtime rappers from the state: Rapsody, King Mez, Kooley High, Ignite Mindz, Drique London, SkyBlew, Azon Blaze, Donovan McCray, Lazarus, Thee Tom Hardy, Troop 41, Bryce Snow, Slum Village, Lute, Deniro Farrar, Justus League, Edgar Allen Floe, L.E.G.A.C.Y., Kaze, Banknote Mitch, Khrysis, Keaton, Wells, Tucson, Ghost Dog, & many more.

North Carolina really reached full acceptance into hip hop's heights with the rise of J Cole and his Dreamville Records (Fayetteville) in the early 2010s, which still see successful Dreamville Music Festivals being organized and thrown annually in 2021.

Another noteworthy rap artist from North Carolina is DaBaby, hailing from Charlotte. Although sometimes drawing attention from self-created controversies, his lyrical skills, mixed with his exposure and unique voice, have made him a  reckonable force in hip-hop.

Crunk

The term crunk is mainly used to denote a musical style that was originated by Three Six Mafia in Memphis, Tennessee, in the mid-to-late 1990s. It was popularized by Atlanta rapper Lil Jon, and gained mainstream popularity in the period 2003–04. A typical crunk track uses a drum machine rhythm, heavy bassline, and shouting vocals, often in call and response manner.

See also
G funk
Mumble rap
Trap music
Snap music
African-American music
Music of Atlanta
Music of Miami
Music of Texas
Phonk
Hip hop in Washington, D.C.
Music of Louisiana
Music of New Orleans
Music of Mississippi
Music of North Carolina
Music of Tennessee

References

Further reading
Culture Wars. Rodney Carmichael 
A Musical Journey Through Atlanta's Hip-hop History. Stephen Fowler 
A Brief History On How We Became The Hub Of Hip-hop & Rap. Kelsey Glass 
Rap, Hip-hop, and Bounce Music. Matt Miller 
A Brief History Of New Orleans' Bounce Music Style. Rebeca Trejo

External links
 Film New Flavors: The Emergence of Southern Hip Hop (2008)
 Hip Hop in North Carolina (2012)
 News about Southern hip hop artists
 Matt Miller, "Dirty Decade: Rap Music and the U.S. South, 1997-2007", Southern Spaces, June 10, 2008.

 
African-American music
Rappers from North Carolina
1980s in American music
1990s in American music
2000s in American music
2010s in American music
American hip hop scenes
American hip hop genres
Culture of the Southern United States
African-American culture
Music of Atlanta
2020s in American music